Valeriya Tsoy (born 8 July 1988 in Oskemen) is an Olympic snowboarder, author and public speaker. In 2014, she became the first snowboarder to represent Kazakhstan in the Winter Olympics.

Tsoy competed at the 2014 Winter Olympics for Kazakhstan. She was 23rd in the qualifying run of the parallel giant slalom and 32nd in the qualifying of the parallel slalom,  

Tsoy made her World Cup debut in March 2011. Her best finish is 4th, in a parallel giant slalom at Sochi in 2012–13. Her best overall finish is 12th, in 2013–14.

Valeriya was published in numerous magazines, including Men's Health and Harper's Bazaar.

She modelled for multiple advertising campaigns for sport brands and is often participating in public speaking engagements.

She is currently residing in Vancouver, BC with her family.

References

1988 births
Living people
Olympic snowboarders of Kazakhstan
Snowboarders at the 2014 Winter Olympics
Sportspeople from Oskemen
Kazakhstani female snowboarders